Norgrove Court is a stately home near Redditch in North Eastern Worcestershire built in 1649. It is listed Grade I on the National Heritage List for England.

Location
Norgrove Court is located on Norgrove Lane, in the parish of Feckenham near the hamlets of Elcock's Brook and Callow Hill, in Worcestershire.

History
Built in 1649, it was nationally recorded as a listed building in 1954. The Old Cottage to the south west of Norgrove Court is listed Grade II and is the only surviving outbuilding of the main house. N Pevsner documented the house.

Notable residence
Sir Thomas Cookes (1648–1701), settled an endowments on Bromsgrove School and Worcester College, Oxford with a preference for students from Feckenham among others.

References

External links

Country houses in Worcestershire
Grade I listed buildings in Worcestershire
Grade II listed buildings in Worcestershire
Grade I listed houses
Grade II listed houses
Houses completed in 1649
Redditch